Abijah Adams (1754May 18, 1816) was a journalist who frequently found himself involved in controversies.  He was born in Boston, Massachusetts.

He was trained as a tailor, and married Lucy Ballard in 1790.  In 1799, he took a job with the newspaper the Independent Chronicle, a Jeffersonian newspaper controlled by his brother, Thomas Adams.  That year he was convicted of libel against the Federalist-controlled state government for his role in the newspaper's vocal opposition to the Alien and Sedition Acts.  He was sentenced to thirty days in jail.  The following year, he was promoted to the position of editor, which he shared with Ebenezer Rhodes.  In 1811, he received a conviction for libel arising from his comments on the conduct in office of Theophilus Parsons, who was at the time the Chief Justice of the Massachusetts Supreme Judicial Court, but was later pardoned.  He died in 1816.

References

"Contemporary Opinion of the Virginia and Kentucky Resolutions", F. M. Anderson.  The American Historical Review, Vol. 5, 62–63, 225–28.
Who Was Who in America, Historical Volume, 1607–1896. Chicago: Marquis Who's Who, 1963.

1754 births
1816 deaths
People from colonial Boston
18th-century American people
19th-century American journalists
American tailors
American male journalists
19th-century American male writers